Ashley Alton "Ash" McGregor (born 3 September 1953) is a former New Zealand rugby union player. A loose forward, McGregor represented Southland and, briefly, Otago at a provincial level. He was a member of the New Zealand national side, the All Blacks, on their 1978 tour of Britain and Ireland, playing three matches but no internationals.

References

1953 births
Living people
People from Gore, New Zealand
New Zealand rugby union players
New Zealand international rugby union players
Southland rugby union players
Otago rugby union players
Rugby union number eights
Rugby union flankers
Rugby union players from Southland, New Zealand